The 2017–18 Cyprus Basketball Division A is the 51st season of the Cyprus Basketball Division A, the top-tier level men's professional basketball league on Cyprus.

Competition format
Seven teams joined the regular season, where after a three-legs round-robin tournament, the four first qualified would join the playoffs for the title.

Teams and locations

Regular season

League table

Results

First round

Second round

Playoffs

Bracket
Seeded teams played games 1, 2 and (if necessary) 5 at home.

Quarterfinals
In the quarterfinals, teams playing against each other have to win two games to win the series. Thus, if one team wins two games before all three games have been played, the remaining game is omitted. The team that finished in the higher regular season place, is going to play the first and the third (if necessary) game of the series at home.

|}

Semifinals
In the semifinals, teams playing against each other have to win three games to win the series. Thus, if one team wins three games before all five games have been played, the remaining games are omitted. The team that finished in the higher regular season place, is going to play the first, the third and the fifth (if necessary) game of the series at home.

|}

Finals
In the finals, teams playing against each other have to win three games to win the series. Thus, if one team wins three games before all five games have been played, the remaining games are omitted. The team that finished in the higher regular season place, is going to play the first, the third and the fifth (if necessary) game of the series at home.

|}

References

External links
Cyprus Basketball Federation
Cyprus at Eurobasket.com

Cyprus
Basketball
Basketball
Cyprus Basketball Division 1